Portugal women's national roller hockey team is the national team side of Portugal at international roller hockey competitions. It has 3 European titles.

Titles
 European Championship (3)
 1997, 1999, 2001

Other Achievements

World Cup
  2nd place (4)
 1998, 2000, 2008, 2016
  3rd place (1)
 1996
 4th place (4)
 1994, 2002, 2004, 2012

European Championship
  2nd place (4)
 2005, 2011, 2013, 2015
  3rd place (2)
 2003, 2007
 4th place (2)
 1993, 2009

U-20 European Championship
  2nd place (4)
 2000, 2005, 2007, 2009

External links
 Portuguese Skating Federation website

National roller hockey (quad) teams
European national roller hockey (quad) teams
Women's national sports teams of Portugal